Laurence Smart (16 February 1928 – 12 October 2015) was an Australian cricketer. He played five first-class matches for South Australia between 1950 and 1958.

References

External links
 

1928 births
2015 deaths
Australian cricketers
South Australia cricketers
People from Crystal Brook, South Australia